Rivolta is an Italian surname. Notable people with the surname include:

Achille Rivolta (1908–1992), Italian philatelist
Alberto Rivolta (born 1967), Italian footballer
Enrico Rivolta (1905–1974), Italian footballer
Matteo Rivolta (born 1991), Italian swimmer
Renzo Rivolta (1908–1966), Italian engineer

Italian-language surnames